Microtubule-associated proteins 1A/1B light chain 3A is a protein that in humans is encoded by the MAP1LC3A gene. Two transcript variants encoding different isoforms have been found for this gene.

Function 

MAP1A and MAP1B are microtubule-associated proteins which mediate the physical interactions between microtubules and components of the cytoskeleton. MAP1A and MAP1B each consist of a heavy chain subunit and multiple light chain subunits. The protein encoded by this gene is one of the light chain subunits and can associate with either MAP1A or MAP1B.

MAPLC3A is one of the mammalian homologues of yeast ATG8, an important marker and effector of autophagy.

Regulation 

MAP1LC3A is regulated by several post-translational modifications. These include covalent linkage of the C-terminus to phosphatidylethanolamine in autophagic membranes, and phosphorylation by protein kinase A, which downregulates its autophagy functions. Noncovalent interactions are important for its cargo targeting functions in selective autophagy. For example, it has been shown to interact with sequestosome 1.

References

Further reading